Jaswant Singh Rathore (26 December 1626 – 28 December 1678) was a Maharaja of Marwar in the present-day Indian state of Rajasthan. He was a distinguished man of letters and author of "Siddhant-bodh", "Anand Vilas" and "Bhasa-bhusan".

Early life
Born on 26 December 1626 at Burhanpur, Jaswant Singh was the youngest son of Maharaja Gaj Singh of Marwar. His mother,  Sisodini Pratap Deviji, was the favorite wife of his father and was the daughter Bhan Sisodia, eldest son of Shakti Singh Sisodia.

Reign
Jaswant Singh succeeded his father on his death by special decree of the Emperor Shah Jahan, in accordance with his father's wishes, on 6 May 1638. He was invested by Imperial authority and inherited the parganas of Jodhpur, Siwana, Merta, Sojat, Phalodi and Pokharan (Satalmer) in jagir.

He was installed on the gaddi at Sringar Chowki, Mehrangarh, Jodhpur, on 25 May 1638. He was granted the personal title of Maharaja by the Emperor Shah Jahan, on 6 January 1654.

Battle of Dharmatpur

Jaswant Singh was appointed by Shah Jahan to stop the advance of the rebel prince Aurangzeb and prince Murad. Army of Jaswant Singh and combined army of both the princes met at Dharmatpur, fifteen miles from Ujjain. The battle was fought on 15 April 1658. Jaswant Singh's advisers suggested a night raid to destroy Aurangzeb's artillery and gunpowder as the Rajput army was almost entirely made up of light cavalry, while Aurangzeb had a well equipped army of heavy cavalry, Artillery and Muskets. However Jaswant Singh replied by saying "It is inconsistent with the manliness of the Rajputs or usage, to employ stratagems or make a night attack". Jaswant Singh was defeated and lost 6,000 of his soldiers. Ratan Singh Rathore, Maharaja of Ratlam, Roop Singh Rathore, Maharaja of Kishangarh and Mokand Das Hada, Rao of Kota were amongst those slain in the battle.

Death and succession
Prithviraj Singh was Jaswant Singh's son. It is chronicled in Marwar 'khyats' that Aurangzeb presented Prithviraj Singh a dress which was poisoned. On wearing the dress Prithviraj died on 8 May 1667 in great pain at Delhi. Prithviraj was a good leader and a brave prince. Jaswant could not get over the shock of his son's death. He was very saddened because he had no male heir who could seek revenge.

Jaswant's reign lasted until his death at Jamrud, near Peshawar, on the Vikram Samvat calendar date of 10 Pausha of 1735, equivalent to 28 December 1678 on the Gregorian calendar.  However, another scholar lists 10 Pausha 1735 V.S. as having been on 28 November 1678.

At the time of his death two of his wives were pregnant, and both would later bear sons.  This led to a war in which there were attempts to install Jaswant Singh's elder surviving son Ajit Singh Rathore as ruler of Marwar.

Ancestry

See also
Rulers of Marwar
List of Rajputs

References

Rathaurha, Vira Durgadasa (2005). Ved Prakash Publisher: Rajbhasha Pustak Pratishthan, Shivaji Marg, Delhi 110053. First published 2005. 

1629 births
1678 deaths
Jaswant
Subahdars of Gujarat
Rathores
People from Khyber District